The 2011 Teen Choice Awards ceremony, hosted by Kaley Cuoco, aired live on August 7, 2011, at the Gibson Amphitheatre, Universal City, California. This was the first time that the ceremonies were aired live since the 2007 show.

Ratings
The show was viewed by an estimated 3.17 million Americans with a 1.1 out of 3 rating/share.

Performers
 will.i.am  – Party Like An Animal 
 Selena Gomez & the Scene – "Love You Like a Love Song"
 Jason Derulo – "Don't Wanna Go Home"
 OneRepublic – "Good Life"

Presenters

 Allstar Weekend
 Ashley Greene
 Avril Lavigne
 Blake Lively
 Cameron Diaz
 Cat Deeley
 Charice
 Christopher Mintz-Plasse
 Daniel Radcliffe
 Demi Lovato
 Ed Helms
 Emma Stone
 Ian Somerhalder
 Jason Bateman
 Joe Jonas
 Joel McHale
 John Cena
 Justin Bieber
 Kat Graham
 Katie Leclerc
 Kendall Jenner
 Kellan Lutz
 Kylie Jenner
 Khloé Kardashian
 Kim Kardashian
 Kourtney Kardashian
 Lucy Hale
 Nikki Reed
 Nina Dobrev
 Paul Wesley
 Rachel Bilson
 Rebecca Black
 Rupert Grint
 Shane West
 Shaun White
 Taylor Lautner
 Taylor Swift
 The Miz
 Tom Felton
 Tyler Posey
 Tyra Banks
 Vanessa Marano
 Zooey Deschanel

Winners and nominees
Winners are listed first and highlighted in bold text.

Movies

Television

Music

Miscellaneous

References

External links
 Official TCA Website

 

2011
2011 awards in the United States
2011 in American music
2011 in Los Angeles